Ana María Romero Moreno (born 14 June 1987), commonly known as Willy, is a Spanish retired footballer who played as a midfielder. She previously represented several teams in Spain's Primera División, including Valencia CF, FC Barcelona, Sevilla FC, Rayo Vallecano and RCD Espanyol.

Club career

Romero left Espanyol for local rivals FC Barcelona in summer 2013. After moving on to Valencia CF, she signed for Ajax in July 2016.

International career

She is a member of the Spanish national team and a holder of the 2004 Under-19 European Championship. In November 2011, medical student Romero scored a late goal to force a 2–2 draw with Germany in Motril.

International goals

Personal life
She is in a relationship with Merel van Dongen. They are engaged since December 2021.

References

External links
 
 

1987 births
Living people
Footballers from Seville
Spanish women's footballers
Spain women's international footballers
Primera División (women) players
FC Barcelona Femení players
Rayo Vallecano Femenino players
RCD Espanyol Femenino players
Eredivisie (women) players
AFC Ajax (women) players
Expatriate women's footballers in the Netherlands
Spanish expatriate women's footballers
Spanish expatriate sportspeople in the Netherlands
Women's association football wingers
Valencia CF Femenino players
Real Betis Féminas players
LGBT association football players
Spanish LGBT sportspeople
Lesbian sportswomen
21st-century LGBT people
Spain women's youth international footballers